The list of ship commissionings in 1901 includes a chronological list of all ships commissioned in 1901.


References

See also 

1901
 Ship commissionings